Hymenopyramis is a genus of plants in the family Lamiaceae, first described in 1843. It is native to Indochina and to the Hainan Province of southern China.

Species
Hymenopyramis acuminata H.R.Fletcher - Thailand, Vietnam
Hymenopyramis brachiata Wall. ex Griff. - Thailand, Vietnam, Myanmar; naturalized in India
Hymenopyramis cana Craib - Hainan, Laos, Cambodia, Thailand
Hymenopyramis parvifolia Moldenke - Thailand
Hymenopyramis pubescens Moldenke - Thailand
Hymenopyramis siamensis Craib - Laos, Cambodia, Thailand
Hymenopyramis vesiculosa H.R.Fletcher - Thailand

References

Lamiaceae
Lamiaceae genera